The  2nd Battle of Mobile, also known as the Battle at the Village, was a British attempt to recapture the town of Mobile, in the British province of West Florida, from the Spanish during the Anglo-Spanish War.  The Spanish had previously captured Mobile in March 1780. On January 7, 1781, a British attack against a Spanish outpost on the Eastern Shore of Mobile Bay was repulsed, and the German leader of the expedition was killed.

Background
After Spain declared war on Great Britain in 1779, Bernardo de Gálvez, the Governor of Spanish Louisiana, immediately began offensive operations to gain control of neighboring British West Florida, which included parts of today's Louisiana, Mississippi, and Alabama. In September 1779 he gained complete control over the lower Mississippi River by capturing Fort Bute and shortly afterwards obtaining the surrender of the remaining enemy forces in the region following the Battle of Baton Rouge. He followed up these successes with the capture of Mobile on March 14, 1780, following a brief siege. (In the spring of 1781, Gálvez would go on to capture Pensacola, British West Florida's administrative capital.)

After the Mobile victory, the Spanish built an entrenched outpost on the east side of Mobile Bay, in an area that controlled Mobile's water supply. When the British troops arrived on January 7, the outpost was manned by about 200 men of the Principe Regiment, under Ramon de Castro y Gutierrez.

Prelude
The British garrison nearest to Mobile was in West Florida's capital, Pensacola.  The commander, General John Campbell, had under his command about 500 men, composed mostly of men from the 16th and 60th Regiments, but also including some Waldecker grenadiers and some Loyalist militia.  The British relations with the Creeks, Chickasaw, and Choctaw Indians were also relatively good. Hundreds of Choctaw warriors responded to British pleas for help and came to Mobile.

Emboldened by the destruction of a Gálvez-led expedition against Pensacola by a hurricane in the fall of 1780, Campbell decided to attempt the recapture of Mobile.  On January 3,  he dispatched an expedition of more than 700 men under the command of the Waldecker Captain Johann von Hanxleden.

Battle
Hanxleden's force arrived near the outpost late on January 6, and made a dawn attack the next morning.  Forty of the Spaniards made a dash for a boat anchored nearby, but the British cut many of them down with a musket volley.  Indians from the expedition then followed the Spaniards into the water to collect scalps.  The remaining Spanish coolly opened fire on the British, killing Hanxleden and nineteen others. Don Ramon de Castro led a successful bayonet charge against 3 to 1 odds. The British troops then disengaged and retreated.

Aftermath
The British withdrew back to Pensacola, and made no further attempts against Mobile.  Spanish authorities in Cuba dispatched additional forces to hold Mobile when they learned of the attack. Spanish Field Marshal Gálvez captured Pensacola later in the year, completing his conquest of West Florida.

Ramon de Castro y Gutiérrez later used this experience for the defensive plans of San Juan, Puerto Rico, where he became Captain General in 1795, after the invasion of Trinidad in 1797. The English attacked San Juan a few months after Trinidad.

See also

List of American Revolutionary War battles

References

Battles of the Anglo-Spanish War (1779–1783)
Battles involving Spain
Battles involving Great Britain
Battle of Mobile (1781)
Battle of Mobile (1781)
Battle of Mobile (1781)
Battle of Mobile (1781)
West Florida